The 1979 Swedish Open was a men's professional tennis tournament played on outdoor clay courts and held in Båstad, Sweden. It was part of the 1979 Grand Prix circuit. It was the 32nd edition of the tournament and was held from 16 July through 22 July 1979. Björn Borg won the singles title.

Finals

Singles
 Björn Borg defeated  Balázs Taróczy 6–1, 7–5
 It was Borg's 8th singles title of the year and the 47th of his career.

Doubles
 Heinz Günthardt /  Bob Hewitt defeated  Mark Edmondson /  John Marks 6–2, 6–2

References

External links
 ITF tournament edition details

Swedish Open
Swedish Open
Swedish Open
Swedish Open